Acartia clausi is a species of marine copepod belonging to the family Acartiidae. This species was previously thought to have a worldwide distribution but recent research  has restricted its range to coastal regions of the north-eastern Atlantic Ocean as far north as Iceland, the Mediterranean Sea and the Black Sea, with specimens from other regions assigned to different species.

At just over 1 mm in length, this is a generally larger animal than its closest congeners. It can also be distinguished by the row of large spines at the rear margin of the body segment known as the metasome.

References

Acartia clausi at World of Copepods

Calanoida
Crustaceans described in 1889